Peter Goes (born 1968 in Ghent) is a Belgian author and illustrator of children's stories. His best known book is Timeline, described by The Financial Times as "hugely informative, hugely entertaining."

Goes has worked as a stage manager. He studied animation at the Royal Academy of Fine Arts in Ghent.

Books in English
2015 – Timeline
2016 – Timeline Activity Book
2017 – Follow Finn
2018 – Rivers

External links
 Peter Goes Timeline | Picturebook
 Peter Goes | Gecko Press
 Peter Goes | Flanders Literature
 Peter Goes | Picturebookmakers

References

1968 births
Belgian children's writers
Living people
Royal Academy of Fine Arts (Ghent) alumni